Pseudophilautus jagathgunawardanai (Jagath Gunawardana's shrub frog) is a species of frogs in the family Rhacophoridae, endemic to Sri Lanka.

Its natural habitats are wet lowland forests of Sri Lanka. It is threatened by habitat loss. It is one of the 8 species of rhacophorids that was discovered from Adam's Peak in 2013.

See also 

 Jagath Gunawardana

References

jagathgunawardanai
Endemic fauna of Sri Lanka
Frogs of Sri Lanka
Amphibians described in 2013